Olli "Ollie" Tukiainen is a Finnish musician and the guitarist of the rock band Poets of the Fall.

Biography 
Before joining Poets of the Fall, Tukiainen, along with Poets vocalist Marko Saaresto, made songs for Playground, which was Saaresto's band before Poets of the Fall. Shortly after, they were joined by Markus Kaarlonen whom Saaresto got to know him through his friend Sami Järvi, a scriptwriter working at Remedy Entertainment.

Gear 

Guitars
 Ibanez UV777BK Steve Vai Signature (current)
 Ibanez JEM77BRMR

Amplification

Peavey 5150 II Head

Effects
 Boss GT-100
 Ibanez Tubescreamer TS7
 Digitech Whammy 4
 Boss NS2
 Boss OD3

 Boss GT-1000

References

External links
Official Website

Discography 
Signs of Life (2005, Insomniac)
Carnival of Rust (2006, Insomniac)
Revolution Roulette (2008, Insomniac)
Twilight Theater (2010, Insomniac)
Temple of Thought (2012, Insomniac)
Jealous Gods (2014, Insomniac)
Clearview (2016, Insomniac)
Ultraviolet (2018, Insomniac)

Living people
Finnish male musicians
Seven-string guitarists
1977 births
Place of birth missing (living people)
21st-century guitarists
21st-century male musicians